Charles F. "Willie" Geny (November 14, 1913 – December 19, 1999) was an American college football and basketball player for the Vanderbilt Commodores. He was football's Southeastern Conference player of the year in 1935. As captain of the Commodores, he led them to their first defeat of rival Tennessee in nine years. He was inducted into the Tennessee Sports Hall of Fame in 1985. He later sold insurance. Geny persuaded Billy Joe Adcock to attend Vanderbilt.

References

1913 births
1999 deaths
American football ends
American men's basketball players
Vanderbilt Commodores men's basketball players
Vanderbilt Commodores football players
Players of American football from Nashville, Tennessee
Basketball players from Nashville, Tennessee